Ezequiel Martín Almirón (born 20 August 2002) is an Argentine footballer currently playing as a forward for Boca Juniors.

Career statistics

Club

References

2002 births
Living people
People from Temperley
Footballers from Buenos Aires
Argentine footballers
Association football forwards
Argentine Primera División players
Boca Juniors footballers